Kosmos 106 ( meaning Cosmos 106), also known as DS-P1-I No.1 was a satellite which was used as a radar target for anti-ballistic missile tests.

It was launched aboard a Kosmos-2M 63S1M rocket, from Site 86/1 at Kapustin Yar. The launch occurred at 12:28 GMT on 25 January 1966. It was the only DS-P1-I satellite to be launched on the short-lived Kosmos-2M before launches switched to the Kosmos-2I 63SM variant.

It decayed from orbit on 14 November 1966.

Kosmos 106 was the first of nineteen DS-P1-I satellites to be launched. Of these, all reached orbit successfully except the DS-P1-I No.6 (seventh), on 30 January 1970.

See also

 1966 in spaceflight

References

Spacecraft launched in 1966
Kosmos satellites
1966 in the Soviet Union
Dnepropetrovsk Sputnik program